Bucaea is a genus of tiger moths in the family Erebidae. The moths in the genus are found in Hindustan.

Species
Bucaea fumipennis (Hampson, 1891)
Bucaea simplex (Walker, [1865] 1864)

References

 , 2007: The systematic position of the genera Bucaea Walker, 1866 and Tamilarctia Dubatolov & Kishida, 2005. Atalanta 38 (1/2): 213-216, colour pl. 10 (p. 316). Full article: 
 , 2005: New genera of Arctiinae (Lepidoptera, Arctiidae) from South and East Asia. Tinea 18 (4): 307-314.
 , 1864 [1865]: List of the Specimens of Lepidopterous Insects in the Collection of the British Museum. London 31 suppl.: 321 p.
 , 1865 [1866], List Spec. lepid. Ins. Colln Br. Mus. 35: 1983

External links
Natural History Museum Lepidoptera generic names catalog

Spilosomina
Moth genera